The 2020 CONCACAF Women's U-17 Championship was originally to be the 7th edition of the CONCACAF Women's U-17 Championship, the biennial international youth football championship organised by CONCACAF for the women's under-17 national teams of the North, Central American and Caribbean region. The tournament was originally scheduled to be held in Mexico between 18 April and 3 May 2020. However, on 19 March 2020, CONCACAF announced the decision to postpone the tournament due to the COVID-19 pandemic, with the new dates of the tournament to be confirmed later.

The final tournament was expanded from eight to 20 teams, using the same format as the 2019 CONCACAF U-17 Championship. The top three teams of the tournament would have qualified for the 2021 FIFA U-17 Women's World Cup (originally 2020 but postponed due to COVID-19 pandemic) in India as the CONCACAF representatives. However, FIFA announced on 17 November 2020 that this edition of the World Cup would be cancelled. Following this announcement, CONCACAF decided on the same day that the 2020 CONCACAF Women's U-17 Championship, which served as the regional qualifiers, would be cancelled.

United States were the defending champions.

Qualified teams

The qualifying format has changed since the 2018 edition, and the teams are no longer divided into regional zones.

The 41 CONCACAF teams were ranked based on the CONCACAF Women's Under-17 Ranking as of 2018. A total of 32 teams entered the tournament. The highest-ranked 16 entrants were exempt from qualifying and advanced directly to the group stage of the final tournament, while the lowest-ranked 16 entrants had to participate in the qualifying stage, where the four group winners advanced to the round of 16 of the knockout stage of the final tournament.

Venues
Mexican Football Federation Headquarters, Toluca

Draw
The draw for the group stage took place on 9 May 2019, 11:00 EDT (UTC−4), at the CONCACAF Headquarters in Miami. The 16 teams which entered the group stage were drawn into four groups of four teams. Based on the CONCACAF Women's Under-17 Ranking, the 16 teams were distributed into four pots, with teams in Pot 1 assigned to each group prior to the draw, as follows:

Squads

Players born on or after 1 January 2003 are eligible to compete. Each team must register a squad of 20 players, two of whom must be goalkeepers.

Group stage
The top three teams in each group advance to the round of 16, where they are joined by the four teams advancing from the qualifying stage.

Tiebreakers
The ranking of teams in each group is determined as follows (Regulations Article 12.8):
Points obtained in all group matches (three points for a win, one for a draw, zero for a loss);
Goal difference in all group matches;
Number of goals scored in all group matches;
Points obtained in the matches played between the teams in question;
Goal difference in the matches played between the teams in question;
Number of goals scored in the matches played between the teams in question;
Fair play points in all group matches (only one deduction could be applied to a player in a single match):
Yellow card: −1 points;
Indirect red card (second yellow card): −3 points;
Direct red card: −4 points;
Yellow card and direct red card: −5 points;
Drawing of lots.

All times are local, CDT (UTC−5).

Group E

Group F

Group G

Group H

Knockout stage
In the knockout stage, if a match is level at the end of 90 minutes, extra time is played, and if still tied after extra time, the match is decided by a penalty shoot-out (Regulations Article 12.13).

Bracket

Round of 16

Quarter-finals

Semi-finals
Winners would have qualified for 2021 FIFA U-17 Women's World Cup.

Third place match
Winner would have qualified for 2021 FIFA U-17 Women's World Cup.

Final

References

External links
Concacaf Women's Under-17 Championship, CONCACAF.com

 
2020
Women's U-17 Championship
2020 in women's association football
2020 in youth association football
2020 FIFA U-17 Women's World Cup qualification
International women's association football competitions hosted by Mexico
Association football events cancelled due to the COVID-19 pandemic